KIAA0196 (also known as strumpellin) is a human gene. The product is a protein that is a component of the WASH complex, which regulates actin assembly on intracellular vesicles. Mutations in KIAA0196 are implicated in some forms of hereditary spastic paraplegia.

References

External links
  GeneReviews/NCBI/NIH/UW entry on Spastic Paraplegia 8 and the involvement of the protein strumpellin

Further reading